Leonard Benedict Loeb (September 16, 1891 – June 17, 1978) was a Swiss-born American physicist. He was the son of Jacques Loeb a German-born American physiologist and biologist.
Leonard B. Loeb wrote a number of physics books, including Atomic Structure.

References

External links

 

1891 births
1978 deaths
Experimental physicists
University of California, Berkeley faculty
University of Chicago alumni
Fellows of the American Physical Society
Swiss emigrants to the United States